Sebastiaan Jacques Henri "Bas" van de Goor (born 4 September 1971, in Oss) is a retired volleyball player from the Netherlands, who represented his native country at two consecutive Summer Olympics, starting in 1996. He was elected twice as the most valuable player of the Olympic (1996-2000).

At his Olympic debut, he won the gold medal, alongside his younger brother and three-time Olympian Mike, by defeating arch rivals Italy (3-2) in the final. Four years later, Van de Goor ended up in fifth place at the 2000 Summer Olympics in Sydney, Australia.

His national volleyball coach Joop Alberda referred to him as the 'Michael Jordan of volleyball.'

In 2003, Van de Goor was diagnosed with type 1 diabetes. He has founded the Bas van de Goor Foundation, aimed at "improving the quality of life for people with diabetes through sports".

References

  Dutch Olympic Committee

1971 births
Living people
Dutch men's volleyball players
Volleyball players at the 1996 Summer Olympics
Volleyball players at the 2000 Summer Olympics
Olympic gold medalists for the Netherlands
Olympic volleyball players of the Netherlands
Sportspeople from Oss
Olympic medalists in volleyball
Medalists at the 1996 Summer Olympics
Middle blockers
20th-century Dutch people
21st-century Dutch people